Carlo Cerioni (11 November 1925 – 29 December 2009) was an Italian basketball player. He competed in the men's tournament at the 1948 Summer Olympics and the 1952 Summer Olympics.

References

1925 births
2009 deaths
Italian men's basketball players
Olympic basketball players of Italy
Basketball players at the 1948 Summer Olympics
Basketball players at the 1952 Summer Olympics
Basketball players from Rome
Dinamo Sassari coaches